Ihering's Atlantic spiny-rat or Ihering's spiny rat (Trinomys iheringi) is a spiny rat species from South America. It is endemic to Brazil, and was named in honor of Hermann von Ihering.

References

Trinomys
Rodents of South America
Mammals of Brazil
Endemic fauna of Brazil
Mammals described in 1911
Taxa named by Oldfield Thomas